Pidhaichyky may refer to the following places in Ukraine:

 Pidhaichyky, Ivano-Frankivsk Oblast, Ivano-Frankivsk Oblast
 Pidhaichyky, Sambir Raion, Lviv Oblast
 Pidhaichyky, Zolochiv Raion, Lviv Oblast
 Pidhaichyky, Terebovlia urban hromada, Ternopil Raion, Ternopil Oblast, Ternopil Oblast
 Pidhaichyky, Zboriv urban hromada, Ternopil Raion, Ternopil Oblast, Ternopil Oblast